"Surulere" (which translates to "Patience is Rewarding" or "Patience is Profitable") is a song by Nigerian singer Dr SID. It was released on November 13, 2013, as the lead single from his second studio album Siduction (2013). Don Jazzy produced the song and was featured on it. "Surulere" peaked at number 1 on MTV Base's Official Naija Top 10 chart from March 21 through March 27, 2014. It also peaked at number 2 on the Pulse Nigeria Music Video chart. Moreover, it was ranked fourth on YouTube's most watched Nigerian videos for the first quarter of 2014. In a nutshell, the song is a reflection of Dr SID's musical journey.

Background and meaning
"Surulere" literally translates to "Patience is rewarding" or "Patience is profitable". While on the set of MTV Base's Official Naija Top 10 chart in March 2014, Dr SID said "Surulere" represents one's desire to achieve their goals and aspirations. He also said the music video addresses the need for patience among parents who pressurized their children to have kids right after marriage.

Music video
The music video for "Surulere" was uploaded to YouTube on January 23, 2014. It features Don Jazzy and Dr SID dancing in front of an undisclosed house. The video stars Funke Akindele, Helen Paul and Blossom Chukwujekwu. It tells the story of a young couple (Blossom Chukwujekwu and Helen Paul) who struggles with childbearing. Despite Chukwujekwu's mother (Funke Akindele) attempt at ending her son's marriage, the couple overcame the stigma of childbearing that young couples often experience.

Reception

Cultural reception
In January 2014, Dr SID's fans began uploading pictures of themselves transitioning from grass to grace; they tagged the pictures with the hashtag "Surulere". Musicians such as Tiwa Savage, Don Jazzy, Jude Engees Okoye, Wizkid, Banky W., D'Prince and Ice Prince also uploaded pictures of themselves to social media.

Critical reception
"Surulere" received positive reviews from music critics. Uche Briggs of YNaija praised the song's hook and said it "has a flavour that reminds one of Yam and palm oil – with salt, of course". On the contrary, the music video for "Surulere" received lukewarm reviews. Jim Donnett called the video "vanity" and said it "mirrors nothing close to the patience virtue."

Live performances
Dr SID and Don Jazzy performed the song for the second time at the Fire of Zamani album launch concert, which took place at the Eko Hotel and Suites on November 23, 2013. On April 20, 2014, Dr SID performed "Surulere" at the Easter edition of AY Live. In May 2014, he performed "Surulere" with Phyno at the 2014 edition of Star Music Trek.

Accolades
"Surulere" won Best Collabo of the Year at the 2014 City People Entertainment Awards. It was nominated for Song of the Year at the 2014 MTV Africa Music Awards, and for Best Pop Single and Song of the Year at The Headies 2014.  Furthermore, it was nominated for Hottest Single of the Year at the 2014 Nigeria Entertainment Awards. The music video for "Surulere" was nominated for Most Gifted West and Most Gifted Video of the Year at the 2014 Channel O Music Video Awards. The remix of "Surelere" was nominated for Best Collabo at the 2014 African Muzik Magazine Awards.

Surulere Remix

The official remix of "Surulere" features vocals by Don Jazzy, Wizkid and Phyno. It appeared on the Siduction album and is a deviation from Dr SID's usual theme of love, romance and sex. The song was also produced by Don Jazzy and recorded in November 2013, at the Mavin Headquarters in Lekki, Lagos.

Critical reception
The remix of "Surulere" received mixed reviews from music critics. Jim Donnett of YNaija extensively said, "Wizkid sounds a bit rushed, at some point, he's losing timing on the beat and then later on, clashing harmonies with Don Jazzy. Phyno on the other hand, is genius. He gives a self composed, on point delivery and in his expected local dialect." A writer for Fuse.com.ng awarded the song 3 stars out of 5, commending its production and hidden sound. However, the writer said it would have been exceptional has Wizkid's verse being omitted. A writer for the website GTCrea8 criticized Wizkid and Phyno's inclusion on the track and said it "sounded like a rush job."

Covers and remixes 
Digital download
"Surulere" (Official remix featuring Don Jazzy, Wizkid and Phyno) - 4:19
"Surulere" (Tiwa Savage remix)

Radio and release history

References

External links

2013 songs
2013 singles
Dr SID songs
Wizkid songs
Song recordings produced by Don Jazzy
Don Jazzy songs
Yoruba-language songs